

The CAMS 46 was a flying boat trainer aircraft built in France in the mid-1920s, essentially an updated version of the CAMS 30 that had flown in 1922. While retaining that aircraft's basic form, CAMS offered the French Navy two new versions with aerodynamic refinements over the earlier aircraft: the CAMS 46 E primary trainer, and the CAMS 46 ET intermediate trainer. Only the latter was selected for production and was built in quantity to supply one escadrille at the Naval training station at Hourtin.

Variants
CAMS 42 ET.2(Jane's 1928 has this aircraft designated CAMS 42 ET.2, probably the CAMS 46 mis-identified) Flying boat trainer powered by a /  Hispano-Suiza 8 V-8 engine.
CAMS 46 E A primary trainer flying boat derived from the CAMS 30, powered by a  Hispano-Suiza 8Ab V-8 engine.
CAMS 46 ET The intermediate trainer version of the CAMS 46, powered by a  Hispano-Suiza 8Ab V-8 engine.

Operators

French Navy

Specifications (46 ET)

References

Further reading
 
 

1920s French military trainer aircraft
Flying boats
46
Single-engined pusher aircraft
Biplanes
Aircraft first flown in 1926